Oncholaimoidea is a superfamily of nematodes. It is the only superfamily in the monotypic suborder Oncholaimina .

Notes 

Enoplia